Pihva is a village in Tartu, Tartu County in Estonia.

References

Villages in Tartu County